Hammami may refer to:

People
Chadi Hammami (born 1986), Tunisian footballer
Hamma Hammami (born 1952), Tunisian communist
Nacer Hammami (born 1980), Algerian footballer
Said Hammami (died 1978), Palestinian politician, diplomat and journalist
Tahar Hammami (1947–2009), Tunisian poet

Places
Hammami, Iran, in Fars Province

See also
 El Hammamy